Mateo Aimerich (1715–1799) was a philologist born in Bordils, Province of Girona, Spain.

Life 
He entered the Society of Jesus at eighteen, and, having finished his studies, taught philosophy and theology in several colleges of his Order. He was subsequently rector of Barcelona and Cervera, and chancellor of the University of Gandia. He was in Madrid, supervising the printing of some books, when the decree of the expulsion of the Society from Spain was announced. He went on board ship without complaint, reportedly thinking only of consoling his companions, several of whom were old and infirm. He took up his abode in Ferrara, Italy and it was there, in exile, that he carried out much of his philological work.  His only help was the public library, and even that his infirmities often prevented him from consulting.

Aimerich died in Ferrara, Italy, in 1799.

Works 
Besides some works of scholastic philosophy, ascetical works, and discourses, we have from his pen the following works:

Monina et acta Episcoporum Barcinonencium
Quinti Moderati Censorini de vitâ et morte linguae Paradoxa philologica, criticis nonnullis dissertationibus opposite, asserta, et probata, of which there were but a few copies printed; the book is consequently very rare.
a defense of the preceding work;
Specimen veteris romanae literaturae deperditae vel adhuc latentis;
Novum Lexicon historicum et criticum antiquae romanae literaturae. This work, which is the sequel to the preceding, was the one which made Aimerich's reputation. He left also an MS., which was a supplement to his dictionary; and a number of Latin discourses.

References

1715 births
1799 deaths
18th-century Spanish Roman Catholic theologians
18th-century Spanish Jesuits
Spanish philologists
Spanish emigrants to Italy